Phorcus is a genus of sea snails, marine gastropod mollusks in the subfamily Cantharidinae  of the family Trochidae, the top snails.

Distribution
These marine species are algal grazers in the northeastern Atlantic Ocean and Mediterranean Sea.

Species
Species within the genus Phorcus include:
 Phorcus articulatus (Lamarck, 1822)
 Phorcus atratus (Wood, 1828)
 † Phorcus burgadoi Martín-González, 2018 
 † Phorcus gallicophorcus Landau, Van Dingenen & Ceulemans, 2017
 Phorcus lineatus (da Costa, 1778)
 Phorcus mariae Templado & Rolán, 2012
 Phorcus mutabilis (Philippi, 1846)
 Phorcus punctulatus (Lamarck, 1822)
 Phorcus richardi (Payraudeau, 1826)
 Phorcus sauciatus (Koch, 1845)
 Phorcus turbinatus (Born, 1780)
Species brought into synonymy
 Phorcus margaritaceus Risso, 1826: synonym of Phorcus richardi (Payraudeau, 1826)
 Phorcus semigranosus A. Adams, 1851: synonym of Chlorostoma semigranosum A. Adams, 1851

References

 Nordsieck, F. (1974). Il genere Osilinus Philippi, 1847 nei mari europei. La Conchiglia. 67-68: 21-23.
 Vaught, K.C. (1989). A classification of the living Mollusca. American Malacologists: Melbourne, FL (USA). . XII, 195 pp
 Gofas, S.; Le Renard, J.; Bouchet, P. (2001). Mollusca, in: Costello, M.J. et al. (Ed.) (2001). European register of marine species: a check-list of the marine species in Europe and a bibliography of guides to their identification. Collection Patrimoines Naturels, 50: pp. 180–213
 Donald K.M., Preston J., Williams S.T., Reid D.R., Winter D., Alvarez R., Buge B., Hawkins S.J., Templado J. & Spencer H.G. 2012. Phylogenetic relationships elucidate colonization patterns in the intertidal grazers Osilinus Philippi, 1847 and Phorcus Risso, 1826 (Gastropoda: Trochidae) in the northeastern Atlantic Ocean and Mediterranean Sea. Molecular Phylogenetics and Evolution, 62(1): 35–45

External links
 Risso A. (1826-1827). Histoire naturelle des principales productions de l'Europe Méridionale et particulièrement de celles des environs de Nice et des Alpes Maritimes. Paris, Levrault: Vol. 1: XII + 448 + 1 carta [1826]. Vol. 2: VII + 482 + 8 pl. (fiori) [novembre 1827]. Vol. 3: XVI + 480 + 14 pl. (pesci) [settembre 1827]. Vol. 4: IV + 439 + 12 pl. (molluschi) [novembre 1826]. Vol. 5: VIII + 400 + 10 pl. 
 Philippi, R. A. (1847). Versuch einer systematischen Eintheilung des Geschlechtes Trochus. Zeitschrift für Malakozoologie. 4: 3-11, 17-26
 Monterosato T. A. (di) (1884). Nomenclatura generica e specifica di alcune conchiglie mediterranee. Palermo, Virzi, 152 pp.
 Mörch, O. A. L. (1852-1853). Catalogus conchyliorum quae reliquit D. Alphonso d'Aguirra & Gadea Comes de Yoldi, Regis Daniae Cubiculariorum Princeps, Ordinis Dannebrogici in Prima Classe & Ordinis Caroli Tertii Eques. Fasc. 1, Cephalophora, 170 pp.
 Bucquoy E., Dautzenberg P. & Dollfus G. (1882-1886). Les mollusques marins du Roussillon. Tome Ier. Gastropodes. Paris: Baillière & fils. 570 pp., 66 pls.

 
Trochidae
Gastropod genera
Taxa named by Antoine Risso